The 2020 Moldovan protests were nationwide demonstrations against the pro-Russian prime minister Ion Chicu and were led by supporters of newly elected president Maia Sandu, farmers and young people. Mass protests first began on 21 November and extended to 23 December, the day in which Chicu resigned due to mounting pressure.

See also
 2015–2016 protests in Moldova
 April 2009 Moldovan parliamentary election protests

References

2020 protests
Protests in Moldova